Karl Jindrak (born 10 December 1972) is an Austrian table tennis player. He competed at the 1996 Summer Olympics, the 2000 Summer Olympics, and the 2004 Summer Olympics.

References

1972 births
Living people
Austrian male table tennis players
Olympic table tennis players of Austria
Table tennis players at the 1996 Summer Olympics
Table tennis players at the 2000 Summer Olympics
Table tennis players at the 2004 Summer Olympics
Sportspeople from Vienna